Kalateh-ye Aliabad may refer to:
 Kalateh-ye Aliabad, South Khorasan